Sir John Tomlinson Hibbert  (5 January 1824 – 7 November 1908), known as J. T. Hibbert, was a British barrister and Liberal politician.

Background and education
The eldest son of Elijah Hibbert and Betty Hilton, he was educated at Shrewsbury and St John's College, Cambridge. He was called to the Bar, Inner Temple, in 1849.

Political career
Hibbert was Member of Parliament for Oldham from 1862 to 1874, 1877 to 1886 and 1892 to 1895, when he lost his seat. He served under William Ewart Gladstone as Parliamentary Secretary to the Local Government Board from 1872 to 1874 and again from 1880 to 1883, as Under-Secretary of State for the Home Department from 1883 to 1884, as Financial Secretary to the Treasury from 1884 to 1885 and as Parliamentary and Financial Secretary to the Admiralty from February to July 1886 and under Gladstone and later Lord Rosebery as once again Financial Secretary to the Treasury from 1892 to 1895. In 1886, he was sworn of the Privy Council.

Hibbert served as President of the second day of the second Co-operative Congress in 1870.

In 1889, Hibbert was elected as the first Chairman of the newly created Lancashire County Council. He was later President of the County Councils Association. In 1893 he was appointed a Knight Commander of the Order of the Bath.

He received the honorary degree Doctor of Laws (LL.D.) from the Victoria University of Manchester in February 1902, in connection with the 50th jubilee celebrations of the establishment of the university.

Personal life
Hibbert died in November 1908, aged 84. He is buried at St Paul’s, Lindale, Cumbria.

References

External links 
 

1824 births
1908 deaths
People educated at Shrewsbury School
Alumni of St John's College, Cambridge
English barristers
Members of Lancashire County Council
Liberal Party (UK) MPs for English constituencies
UK MPs 1859–1865
UK MPs 1865–1868
UK MPs 1868–1874
UK MPs 1874–1880
UK MPs 1880–1885
UK MPs 1885–1886
UK MPs 1892–1895
Members of the Privy Council of the United Kingdom
Knights Commander of the Order of the Bath
Presidents of Co-operative Congress
Politics of the Metropolitan Borough of Oldham
Directors of the Furness Railway